The Cullaidh Shale Formation is a geological formation in Scotland, and the lowermost unit of the Great Estuarine Group. It is Bajocian in age. The lithlology largely consists of organic rich mudstone and shales, including oil shale developed near the base.

References

Geology of Scotland
Stratigraphy of the United Kingdom
Bajocian Stage